The 2014 Just Retirement World Indoor Bowls Championship was held at Potters Leisure Resort, Hopton on Sea, Great Yarmouth, England, between January 10–25, 2014. It was won for the first time by Scotland's Darren Burnett. It was sponsored by Just Retirement Group. It was also notable for Shaun Williamson singing (Something Inside) So Strong before the men's singles final.

Winners

Draw and results

Men's singles

Finals

Top half

Bottom half

Women's singles

Open pairs

Mixed pairs

References

External links
Official website

World Indoor Bowls Championship
World Indoor Championship
World Indoor Bowls Championship